Gertrude Kulany (23 November 1951 –  28 January 2021) was a Ugandan legislator, politician and anti- Female Genital Mutilation (FGM) activist. Kulany served in the Constituent Assembly in 1994 and later represented Kapchorwa District as a Woman Member of Parliament between 2001 to 2006 in Uganda's seventh parliament.

Background and education 
Kulany was born to David and Joyce Arapta

She attended Mount Saint Marys College Namagunga for her secondary education then Makerere University. She also held a Diploma in Industrial Methodology and a Certificate in Women's Studies.

Career

Politics 
Kulany was a part of the National Resistance Council between 1989 to 1996. During Uganda's 1994 Ugandan Constituent Assembly election, Kulany was elected as the delegate to represent Kapchorwa district and served in this position till 1995.

Activism 
Kulany campaigned against Female Genital Mutilation.

Administration 
Kulany was the deputy board chairperson of the National Enterprise Corporation (NEC) (2014–2015). In addition to being a board member at the National Social Security Fund (NSSF), Kulany also deputised as a  Director of Research at the National Resistance Movement (NRM) Secretariat from 2005 to 2006.

Personal life 
Kulany died of cancer on 28 January 2021.

See also 

 Kapchorwa district
 Parliament of Uganda
 Rukiya Chekamondo

References 

1951 births
2021 deaths
Members of the Parliament of Uganda
Women members of the Parliament of Uganda
Makerere University alumni
Activists against female genital mutilation
National Resistance Movement politicians
Deaths from cancer
Ugandan women activists